Victoria Park may refer to:

Places

Australia 
 Victoria Park Nature Reserve, a protected area in Northern Rivers region, New South Wales
 Victoria Park, Adelaide, a park and racecourse
 Victoria Park, Brisbane, a public park and former golf course
 Victoria Park, Melbourne, a football ground
 Victoria Park railway station, Melbourne
 Victoria Park, Western Australia, a suburb of Perth
 Electoral district of Victoria Park
 Town of Victoria Park local government area
 Victoria Park railway station, Perth
 Victoria Park Racecourse, Sydney
 Victoria Park, Sydney, a park

Canada 
 Victoria Park, Calgary, Alberta
 Victoria Park (Edmonton), Alberta
 Victoria Park, New Brunswick, a park in Moncton, New Brunswick
 Victoria Park, St. John's, Newfoundland and Labrador
 Victoria Park, Halifax, Nova Scotia
 Victoria Park, Truro, Nova Scotia
 Victoria Park, Kitchener, Ontario
 Victoria Park, London, Ontario
 Victoria Park Avenue, Toronto, Ontario
 Victoria Park station (Toronto)
 Victoria Park Collegiate Institute
 Victoria Park, Charlottetown, Prince Edward Island
 Parc Victoria, Quebec
 Victoria Park, Regina, Saskatchewan
 Victoria Park, (Woodstock), Ontario

New Zealand 
 Victoria Park, Auckland, a park 
 Victoria Park, Christchurch, a park
 Victoria Park, Whanganui, a cricket ground

South Africa 
 Victoria Park, Port Elizabeth, Eastern Cape
 Victoria Park, Queenstown, Eastern Cape
 Victoria Park, Worcester, Western Cape

Sri Lanka 
 Viharamahadevi Park, formerly Victoria Park, Colombo
 Victoria Park, Nuwara Eliya, a park

United Kingdom 
 Victoria Park, Aberdeen, a park
 Royal Victoria Park, Bath, a park
 Victoria Park, Belfast, a park
 Victoria Park, Bideford, a park
 Victoria Park, Dorset
 Victoria Park Football Ground, Bournemouth, a football ground 
 Victoria Park, Bristol, a park
 Victoria Park, Buckie, a football ground 
 Victoria Park, Burscough, a football stadium 
 Victoria Park, Cardiff, a park 
 Victoria Park, Dingwall, a football ground 
 Victoria Park, Edinburgh, a park and neighbourhood
 Victoria Park, Glasgow, a park 
 Victoria Park (Hartlepool), a football ground 
 Victoria Park, Leamington Spa, a park
 Victoria Park, Leicester, a park
 Victoria Park, London, a park in Tower Hamlets
 Victoria Park, Barnet, London, a park
 Victoria Park, Manchester, a district and a park 
 Victoria Park, Newbury, a park
 Victoria Park, Plymouth, a park
 Victoria Park, Portsmouth, a park 
 Victoria Park, Southport, a park
 Victoria Park, St Helens
 Victoria Park, Swansea, a park 
 Victoria Park, Swinton, a park 
 Victoria Park, Warrington
 Victoria Park, Widnes

Other countries

 Victoria Park, Hamilton, Bermuda, a park
 Victoria Park (Hong Kong)
 Victoria Park, Wolvega, a horse racing venue in The Netherlands
 Victoria Park, Los Angeles, California, U.S.
 Bahadur Shah Park, formerly Victoria Park, a park in Dhaka, Bangladesh
 Victoria Park, Fort Lauderdale, Florida, U.S.

Other uses 
 Victoria Park (album), by Aaron Powell, 2015
 Victoria Park (horse), a Canadian thoroughbred racehorse
 Victoria Park, home football ground of Nelson F.C.
 Victoria Park Football Club, 1934–1935, now Perth Football Club

See also 
 Royal Victoria Park (disambiguation)
 Viktoriapark, Kreuzberg, Berlin, Germany